The Boxing competition at the 2010 Summer Youth Olympics was held from 21 August to 25 August 2010 at the Suntec Singapore International Convention and Exhibition Centre.

Qualification

Schedule

Medal summary

Medal table

Events

External links
 Boxing at youth olympics 2010 (official site)

 
2010 Summer Youth Olympics events
Olympics
2010
Boxing in Singapore